Asikuma/Odoben/Brakwa District is one of the twenty-two districts in Central Region, Ghana. Originally created as an ordinary district assembly in 1988, which was created from the Breman-Ajumako-Enyan District Council from 1974 to 1978. The district assembly was located in the northeast part of Central Region and had Breman Asikuma as its capital town.

List of settlements

Sources
 
 District: Asikuma/Odoben/Brakwa District

References

Central Region (Ghana)

Districts of the Central Region (Ghana)